Richard Pittman may refer to:

 Richard A. Pittman (1945–2016), U.S. Marine and Medal of Honor recipient
 Richard Pittman (boxer) (born 1957), Cook Islands boxer

See also
 Richard Pitman, British jockey